HM Prison East Sutton Park is a women's open prison and young offender's institute located in the Parish of East Sutton, near Maidstone in Kent, England. The prison is operated by His Majesty's Prison & Probation Service.

History
East Sutton Park Prison is based in and around an Elizabethan brick house, East Sutton Park, dating from 1570 and overlooking the Weald of Kent. The building was requisitioned at the start of World War II, first opened as a borstal in 1946, then was re-registered to take juvenile and adult females some years later.

In 2016 a report by His Majesty's Chief Inspector of Prisons found "East Sutton Park to be an excellent prison where the very strong 
staff-prisoner relationships underpinned safety and a respectful and purposeful approach to preparing women for release. Violence of any kind was extremely rare and the tensions related to communal living were usually resolved through informal mediation rather than formal disciplinary processes".

The prison today
Accommodation at the prison is divided into 66 rooms of varying sizes. Work at the prison for inmates includes farm work, horticulture, meat processing and catering. East Sutton Park also offers training courses and physical education. Approximately half the prison population work in the community.

Notable former inmates
 Jane Andrews
 Bachan Kaur Athwal, would have been held at East Sutton Park or the only other open prison for women in England, HM Prison Askham Grange, in preparation for her release in June 2022
 Linda Calvey
 Vicky Pryce
 Dena Thompson, murderer and serial fraudster who is also suspected of having more victims, held at either East Sutton Park or HM Prison Askham Grange (the only other open prison for women in England) before her release in June 2022 
 Sarah Tisdall

References

External links
 Ministry of Justice pages on East Sutton Park
 HMP East Sutton Park - HM Inspectorate of Prisons Reports

East Sutton Park
East Sutton Park
East Sutton Park
East Sutton Park